Robert ("Rob") Hubert Maria de Wit (born 7 August 1962 in Eindhoven, North Brabant) is a retired decathlete from the Netherlands. He competed in two consecutive Summer Olympics for his native country, starting in 1988 and is still holding the Dutch national record of 8.447 points in the declathon, achieved in 1988.

In 1994 De Wit participated in the 1994 Winter Olympics in Lillehammer, Norway, as a member of the Dutch bobsledding team, finishing in 24th place in the two-mans discipline.

Achievements

References
  Dutch Olympic Committee
 Profile

1962 births
Living people
Dutch decathletes
Dutch male bobsledders
Athletes (track and field) at the 1988 Summer Olympics
Athletes (track and field) at the 1992 Summer Olympics
Bobsledders at the 1994 Winter Olympics
Olympic athletes of the Netherlands
Olympic bobsledders of the Netherlands
Sportspeople from Eindhoven
World Athletics Championships athletes for the Netherlands